The 1999 Women's Oceania Cup was the inaugural edition of the women's field hockey tournament. It was held from 8 to 12 September in Sydney and Dunedin.

The tournament served as a qualifier for the 2000 Summer Olympics.

Australia won the tournament for the first time, defeating New Zealand in the three–game series, 3–0. However, as Australia had already qualified for the Summer Olympics as the host nation, the entry quota was added to the Olympic Qualification Tournament.

Results

Pool

Fixtures

Statistics

Final standings

Goalscorers

References

1999
1999 in women's field hockey
1999 in Australian women's sport
1999 in New Zealand women's sport
1999 Oceania Cup
1999 Oceania Cup
September 1999 sports events in New Zealand
September 1999 sports events in Australia